The Honourable William Napier Bruce,  (18 January 1858 – 20 March 1936) was a British educationalist and lawyer.

Life

The son of Henry Bruce, 1st Baron Aberdare by his second wife Norah Creina Blanche, Bruce was educated at Harrow School and Balliol College, Oxford, where he read the Greats. In 1882, he married Emily McMurdo, daughter of General Sir William McMurdo. They had one son and one daughter.

In 1883, Bruce was called to the bar from Lincoln's Inn. In 1886, he joined the Charity Commission as Assistant Commissioner under the Endowed Schools Acts, where he served until 1900. In 1900, he was appointed Assistant Secretary to the Board of Education. In 1929, he became Pro-Chancellor of the University of Wales, in succession to Lord Kenyon.

He was appointed a Companion of the Order of the Bath in 1905 and a Member of the Order of the Companions of Honour in 1935. He died in Bath in 1936.

References

1858 births
1936 deaths
Alumni of Balliol College, Oxford
Members of the Order of the Companions of Honour
Younger sons of barons
Companions of the Order of the Bath
People educated at Harrow School
British civil servants
Civil servants in the Charity Commission